Calonge de Segarra is a municipality in the comarca of the Anoia in Catalonia, Spain.

References

External links
 Government data pages 

Municipalities in Anoia